The Macau Ladies Open was a golf tournament on the Ladies Asian Golf Tour hosted in Macau. 

It was only held in 2006 and 2007, and played at the Macau Golf & Country Club, same venue as the Macau Open.

Winners

^ Weather-shortened to 36 holes
Source:

See also
Hong Kong Ladies Open

References

External links
Past Winners - Ladies Asian Golf Tour

Ladies Asian Golf Tour events
Golf tournaments in Macau
Recurring sporting events established in 2006
Recurring sporting events disestablished in 2007
2006 establishments in Macau